The Classic 8 Conference, also known as the C8C, is a high school athletic conference made up of 8 teams in southeastern Wisconsin. The Classic 8 Conference is a member of the WIAA. The conference is one of the newer conferences in the WIAA, having been formed in 1997. The conference has schools that participate in such sports as lacrosse, field hockey, alpine skiing, boys ice hockey, girls ice hockey, and cross-country skiing.

Current Member schools
Current members of the Classic 8 Conference include:
 Arrowhead Warhawks
 Kettle Moraine Lasers 
 Mukwonago Indians 
 Muskego Warriors
 Waukesha North Northstars
 Waukesha South Blackshirts
 Waukesha West Wolverines
 Oconomowoc Raccoons

Classic 8 football
Current members of the Classic 8 Conference have accounted for a total of 26 state appearances, including 15 WIAA State Champions. Of those fifteen state championships, Muskego has two (2018, 2019), Arrowhead has won six (1993, 1994, 1996, 2007, 2012, 2013), Kettle Moraine has won two (1988, 2022), Mukwonago has won one (2004), Catholic Memorial has won four (2012, 2016, 2018, 2019) and Waukesha West has won two (2004, 2010). The conference put its football talents on display especially in 2004, when it had two WIAA state champions in Mukwonago (Division 1) and Waukesha West (Division 2), next in 2012 when it had Arrowhead (Division 1) and Catholic Memorial (Division 3), and most recently in 2018, Muskego (Division 1) and Catholic Memorial (Division 3). Since 2000, the conference has sent 18 teams to the state championships in Madison at Camp Randall (9 state runners-up, 9 championships).

External links
Classic 8 Website

Sports organizations established in 1997
Wisconsin high school sports conferences
1997 establishments in Wisconsin